Dalabyggð is a municipality located in western Iceland. Its main settlement is Búðardalur.

Dalabyggð is an agricultural area that belongs to the municipality of Dalabyggðthe the farm of Hvammur í Dölum where the poet, historian, and politician Snorri Sturluson was born.  There is a thermal bath, Guðrúnarlaug, in the municipality that was named after Guðrún Ósvífrsdóttir from the Laxdæla saga.

The area is renowned for stories and people from Dalabyggð, such as : Auður djúpúðga, Leifur Eiríksson, Steinn Steinarr, Árni Magnússon, Eiríkur rauði, Sturla Þórðarson, and Ásmundur Sveinsson.

There are many places in Dalabyggð with a great story, for example: Eiríksstaðir, Guðrúnarlaug, Haukadalur, and Ólafsdalur.

References

External links 

Official website 

Municipalities of Iceland